"Live from New York, it's Saturday Night!" is a famous phrase typically featured on the American sketch comedy show Saturday Night Live, which runs on the NBC broadcast network. It is generally used as a way to end a cold opening sketch and lead into the opening titles/montage and cast introductions for the program.

Origin 
During the show's first season, the show was known simply as NBC's Saturday Night, due to the existence of an ABC show titled Saturday Night Live with Howard Cosell. This is how the phrase received its wording. The phrase was kept intact even after ABC's SNL was canceled and NBC's Saturday Night adopted the SNL name for itself.

Instances used 

The phrase is typically spoken by a host, cast member(s), and/or musical guest, and has been used in every season except one (the 1981-1982 season, the first full season with Dick Ebersol as producer, except the October 31, 1981 episode). It was first said live on air by Chevy Chase, on SNLs first show on October 11, 1975. For all but two of the first season's 24 episodes (Garrett Morris when Richard Pryor hosted and Gerald Ford when Ron Nessen hosted), Chase delivered the phrase after a pratfall of some kind. Even when the show is not aired on a Saturday—such as the Saturday Night Live Weekend Update Thursday specials aired from 2008 to 2012, and again in 2017—the traditional line is used. 

The person delivering the phrase usually breaks character and the fourth wall, in that the phrase is normally not spoken to other cast members as part of the regular dialogue in the opening sketch. Instead, the person suddenly turns (if not already facing downstage) and delivers the phrase directly to the audience and the camera with a full-throated shout. At the same time, the camera zooms in for a tight close-up shot of the person's face, followed by a dissolve to the show's opening montage and titles.

Readings by special guests 
The line has occasionally been given to a non-host/non-cast member for cameo purposes. This could be for stars like Brad Pitt and Dwayne "The Rock" Johnson, or for more unusual celebrities like Ron Darling, Monica Lewinsky, Who Wants to Be a Millionaire winner John Carpenter, WWE chairman Vince McMahon (on March 18, 2000), Mayor of New York City Rudy Giuliani (on September 29, 2001, two weeks after the September 11 attacks), Carolyn Kepcher (on April 3, 2004), Al Sharpton (on November 2, 2013), Jason Aldean (on October 7, 2017, after paying tribute to the lives lost in the 2017 Las Vegas shooting and to the late Tom Petty), and Stormy Daniels (on May 5, 2018). Guest choristers said the line after singing on December 15, 2012, in the aftermath of the Sandy Hook shooting, but read it in a more restrained tone.

Presidents and presidential hopefuls 
Gerald Ford opened the show with the phrase (in a pre-recorded segment) on April 17, 1976, which came during his presidency, when press secretary Ron Nessen was host.  A series of presidential and vice presidential hopefuls have also announced the phrase on their appearances on the show, beginning with Bob Dole on November 16, 1996 (coming after the 1996 election). It was announced by Barack Obama on November 3, 2007, by Hillary Clinton on March 1, 2008, by Sarah Palin on October 18, 2008, by John McCain on November 1, 2008, and by Elizabeth Warren on March 7, 2020.

References 

Saturday Night Live catchphrases
1975 neologisms
Running gags